Guangqumenwai Station is a station on Line 7 of the Beijing Subway.

First and last time
Beijing West Railway Station — Hua Zhuang
The first train 5:50
The last train 23:35
Hua Zhuang — Beijing West Railway Station
The first train 5:33
The last train 22:48

Station layout 
The station has an underground island platform.

Exits 
There are 3 exits, lettered A, B, and D.

References

Railway stations in China opened in 2014
Beijing Subway stations in Dongcheng District
Beijing Subway stations in Chaoyang District